Gela Dzhambulatovich Zaseyev (born 20 January 1993) is a Russian football midfielder.

Club career
In July 2013 Zaseyev left CSKA Moscow to sign a permanent contract with Alania Vladikavkaz. He made his debut in the Russian Football National League for FC Alania Vladikavkaz on 18 August 2013 in a game against FC Rotor Volgograd.

He made his Russian Premier League debut for FC Khimki on 25 August 2020 in a game against FC Arsenal Tula.

References

External links
 
 
 
 

1993 births
Sportspeople from Moscow Oblast
Living people
Ossetian people
Russian footballers
Russia youth international footballers
Russia under-21 international footballers
Association football midfielders
FC Spartak Vladikavkaz players
FC Baltika Kaliningrad players
PFC CSKA Moscow players
FC Khimki players
Russian Premier League players
FC Strogino Moscow players